Serena Williams defeated her sister, the two-time defending champion Venus Williams, in the final, 7–6(7–3), 6–2 to win the ladies' singles tennis title at the 2009 Wimbledon Championships. It was her third Wimbledon singles title and eleventh major singles title overall. It was also the third time she won a major after saving a match point, which occurred in the semifinals against Elena Dementieva. Serena dropped only one set the entire tournament, to Dementieva in the semifinals.

Venus Williams was attempting to become the first player to win the tournament three consecutive times since Steffi Graf in 1991, 1992 and 1993.

This edition of the tournament saw the top four seeds all reach the semifinals, which remains the most recent time this happened at a major (as of 2022). The match between Serena Williams and Dementieva was the longest women's semifinal at Wimbledon in the Open Era, lasting two hours and 49 minutes.

Seeds

  Dinara Safina (semifinals)
  Serena Williams (champion)
  Venus Williams (final)
  Elena Dementieva (semifinals)
  Svetlana Kuznetsova (third round)
  Jelena Janković (third round)
  Vera Zvonareva (third round, withdrew due to an ankle injury)
  Victoria Azarenka (quarterfinals)
  Caroline Wozniacki (fourth round)
  Nadia Petrova (fourth round)
  Agnieszka Radwańska (quarterfinals)
  Marion Bartoli (third round)
  Ana Ivanovic (fourth round, retired due to a thigh injury)
  Dominika Cibulková (third round)
  Flavia Pennetta (third round)
  Zheng Jie (second round)

  Amélie Mauresmo (fourth round)
  Samantha Stosur (third round)
  Li Na (third round)
  Anabel Medina Garrigues (third round)
  Patty Schnyder (first round)
  Alizé Cornet (first round)
  Aleksandra Wozniak (first round)
  Maria Sharapova (second round)
  Kaia Kanepi (first round)
  Virginie Razzano (fourth round)
  Alisa Kleybanova (second round)
  Sorana Cîrstea (third round)
  Sybille Bammer (first round)
  Ágnes Szávay (first round)
  Anastasia Pavlyuchenkova (second round)
  Anna Chakvetadze (first round)

Qualifying

Draw

Finals

Top half

Section 1

Section 2

Section 3

Section 4

Bottom half

Section 5

Section 6

Section 7

Section 8

Championship match statistics

References

External links

2009 Wimbledon Championships on WTAtennis.com
2009 Wimbledon Championships – Women's draws and results at the International Tennis Federation

Women's Singles
Wimbledon Championship by year – Women's singles
Wimbledon Championships
Wimbledon Championships